James Wright (11 September 1910 – 1978) was an English professional footballer who played as a full-back.

References

1910 births
1978 deaths
People from Okehampton
English footballers
Association football fullbacks
Okehampton F.C. players
Torquay United F.C. players
Grimsby Town F.C. players
Sheffield Wednesday F.C. players
Guildford City F.C. players
Swansea City A.F.C. players
Hartlepool United F.C. players
English Football League players